The ROA (d/b/a Reserve Organization of America) is a professional association of commissioned officers, non-commissioned officers, former officers, enlisted and spouses of the uniformed services of the United States, primarily with the Reserve and National Guard. 

Founded in 1922 and under congressional charter since 1950, Reserve Officers Association of the United States (ROA), now doing business as the Reserve Organization of America, advocates for adequate funding of equipment and training requirements, recruiting and retention incentives, and employment rights for all members of the Reserve. It also advises and educates the Congress, the president, and the American people on national security.

Formation
The ROA was founded on October 2, 1922, when several hundred officers, many of them combat veterans of World War I, first gathered with General of the Armies John J. "Black Jack" Pershing at the Willard Hotel in Washington, D.C., to formally establish a new organization.

Between the World Wars, the right of the Reservist to appear before Congress in support of appropriations and matters affecting the national defense was established. Also during this time, Reserve programs, which were to prove invaluable in the mobilization period of 1941 and 1942, became established on the foundations laid by the citizen-soldiers who had served in World War I.

During World War II, the Association became inactive "for the duration" as its members went off to war. ROA was reactivated in 1946, and in 1948, Reserve Officers of the Naval Services (RONS) merged with ROA. The Marine Corps and Coast Guard entered at about the same time. When law created a separate Department of the Air Force, for the first time the nation had, in ROA, a Reserve association embracing all the Services.

Public Law 595 of the 81st Congress, second session, was "An Act to Incorporate the Reserve Officers Association of the United States." This act established the objective of ROA: "...support and promote the development and execution of a military policy for the United States that will provide adequate National Security."  President Harry S. Truman, one of the early members of ROA, signed the charter on June 30, 1950.

Basic facts
ROA membership is open to all federally commissioned officers, warrant officers, non-commissioned officers, enlisted and their spouses, from the Air Force, Army, Coast Guard, Navy, and Marine Corps, plus the U.S. Public Health Service and the National Oceanic and Atmospheric Administration.
ROA holds a congressional charter, and is established in public law as a corporation to support and promote military policies that will provide adequate national security.
ROA members are major participants in the Interallied Confederation of Reserve Officers (CIOR), Interallied Confederation of Reserve Medical Officers (CIOMR), and Pan American Union of Reserve Officers of the Armed Forces (UPORFA), international organizations that hold annual events in Europe and South America. All national Reserve officer organizations of NATO have joined CIOR since its founding in 1948.

Advocacy and legislative priorities
 
ROA's legislative priorities, largely shaped by the requirements of the War on Terrorism, are:

Reset the whole force to include fully funding equipment and training for the National Guard and Reserves.
Provide adequate resources and authorities to support the current recruiting and retention requirements of the Reserves and National Guard.
Support warriors, families, and survivors.
Assure that the Reserve and National Guard continue in a key national defense role, both at home and abroad.

Programs and services

The Officer Journal

ROA produces a bimonthly journal, The Officer, which focuses largely on national security and defense policy. Each issue has a column covering each branch of the armed forces, a Law Review detailing Reservists' civil rights, the National Security Report, a scholarly paper on some aspect of national security, and the annual year-end issue features contributions from all of the Reserve Components' top commanders. The magazine goes to ROA members, plus all flag and general officers in the Department of Defense and every member of Congress.

Defense Education Forum
ROA's Defense Education Forum (DEF) produces a series of programs featuring experts speaking to topics including homeland security, civil affairs, terrorism, continuum of service, USERRA, and civilian-military relations. Through its professional development seminars, DEF also provides for serving Reserve officers of all the branches professional networking opportunities, on-site mentoring, briefings by senior Department of Defense officials, access to government and military service leaders, personal career information, and training opportunities.

Service Members Law Center
ROA's Service Members Law Center specializes in educating employers and part-time warriors about the Uniformed Servicemembers Employment and Reemployment Rights Act (USERRA), the Servicemembers Civil Relief Act (SCRA), and military voting rights. The Service Members Law Center coordinates the activities of lawyers and legal service providers who seek to help Service members in these areas of the law nationwide, and files amicus curiae (friend of the court) briefs on behalf of ROA in USERRA and SCRA cases that have national significance.

Structure
ROA is organized into 55 departments, one in each of the 50 states, plus departments in Latin America, the District of Columbia, Europe, the Far East, and Puerto Rico. Each department is further divided into regional chapters. There are more than 300 chapters worldwide.

ROA is led by elected national officers, and ROA's business activities are conducted by a national staff in Washington, DC.

ROA Honorees

Minuteman of the Year
Since 1958, ROA has honored each year “The citizen who has contributed most to National Security during these times.” 

Following are the Minutemen of the Year since 1990:

 2011 Tom Latham, US Representative
 2010 Blanche Lincoln, US Senator
 2009 Robert M. Gates, Secretary of Defense
 2008 Joseph I. Lieberman, US Senator
 2007 Gene Taylor, US Representative
 2006 Mary Landrieu, US Senator
 2005 Saxby Chambliss, US Senator
 2004 Lindsey Graham, US Senator
 2003 Mike DeWine, US Senator
 2002 George W. Bush, President; C.W. Bill Young, US Representative
 2001 John McCain, US Senator
 2000 Jeff Sessions, US Senator
 2000 Max Cleland, US Senator
 1999 Bob Livingston, US Representative
 1998 Paul McHale, US Representative; Steve Buyer, US Representative
 1997 William J. Perry, Secretary of Defense
 1996 Floyd Spence, US Representative
 1995 Ike Skelton, US Representative
 1994 Gregory H. Laughlin, US Representative
 1993 Daniel K. Inouye, US Senator
 1992 John P. Murtha, US Representative
 1991 George H.W. Bush, President
 1990 Robert C. Byrd, US Senator

Minuteman Hall of Fame
Since 1959, ROA has also honored each year a citizen or soldier “who has conspicuously contributed to the advancement of ROA programs and objectives.”

Following are the Minuteman Hall of Fame inductees since 1998:

 2011 Daniel R. May, Rear Admiral, USCG
 2010 Jack C. Stultz, Lieutenant General, USAR
 2007 Peter Pace, General, USMC 
 2007 John A. Bradley, Lieutenant General, USAF
 2006 Thomas F. Hall, Assistant Secretary of Defense 
 2005 Robert J. Papp Jr., Rear Admiral, USCG 
 2004 Bob Hope, Patriot 
 2004 Dennis M. McCarthy, Lieutenant General, USMC
 2004 Richard B. Myers, Chairman, Joint Chiefs of Staff
 2003 John B. Totushek, Vice Admiral, USNR 
 2003 James E. Sherrard III, Lieutenant General, USAF
 2002 Russell C. Davis, Lieutenant General, USAF 
 2002 James M. Loy, Admiral, USCG
 2002 Thomas J. Plewes, Lieutenant General, USA
 2001 Robert A. McIntosh, Major General, USAF 
 2000 Charles L. Cragin, Assistant Secretary of Defense 
 1999 Terrence M. O'Connell, Chairman, Reserve Forces Policy Board 
 1998 Robert E. Kramek, Admiral, USCG

References

External links
ROA website.

United States military associations
United States military support organizations
American veterans' organizations
Patriotic and national organizations chartered by the United States Congress